Kern Transit, formerly Kern Regional Transit, is the operator of mass transportation in Kern County, California. Primarily, it provides inter-regional transportation, connecting outlying regions with the city of Bakersfield (and with each other with a transfer in Bakersfield). It also provides inter-city transportation within specific regions. Kern (Regional) Transit is operated by the Kern County Department of Roads. The agency was founded in 1981. Its headquarters are located in Bakersfield.

In January 2017, operation of Kern Transit was taken over by National Express Transit.

Routes

Originate in Bakersfield

Other routes

Hubs and connecting services
Bakersfield is the central hub for the inter-regional routes. Buses stop at the Downtown Transit Center (operated by Golden Empire Transit), or the Bakersfield Amtrak Station which is also located downtown, or both. Bus bays are used at the Amtrak Station, while none are available at the Transit Center. Buses instead park on Chester Avenue, in front of it. Depending on the route, Kern Regional Transit makes additional stops in Bakersfield, but are generally used either to board or discharge passengers (depending on the direction the bus is traveling).

Additional hubs are located in Frazier Park, Lake Isabella, and Mojave. Passengers transfer from inter-regional routes to inter-city routes that serve the specific region. Many of these routes were requested and funded by local governments, instead of operating their own transit system.

Some local governments have funded their own public transportation system, instead of relying on Kern Regional Transit. These include Arvin (Arvin Transit), Delano (Delano Area Rapid Transit), and Taft (Taft Area Transit). In addition, Shafter and Wasco provide their own Dial-a-ride service, which serves their communities.

Fare and schedule
Local Routes:

(140,145,210,220,223,&225) & All Dial-A-Rides operated by Kern Transit

General Fare: $2.00/Reduced Fare: $1.00

Inter-Community Routes:

([100 not traveling through Tehachapi],110,115,120,[130 not traveling through Frazier Park],150,227,230,240,&250)

General Fare: $3.00 Reduced Fare: $1.50

Cross County Routes:

100 traveling through Tehachapi and 130 traveling through Frazier Park

General Fare: $5.00 Reduced Fare: $2.50
 
Operating days vary greatly depending on the route. Most of the long distance inter-regional (100,110,120,130,250)routes run 6 or 7 days a week. However, some (227,230) run 3 days a week. Shorter regional routes (115,210,240) mostly run 2 or 3 days a week. However, some (all Kern River Valley routes, 140,145) run 6 or 7 days a week.

Fleet
Because of the wide variety of demand for service in various areas, Kern Regional Transit uses a variety of vehicles. The fleet consists of 40-foot, 35-foot, 30-foot, and 21-foot buses which are used on scheduled routes depending on the number of riders.

All buses are equipped with wheelchair ramps, and offer bicycle racks. A portion of the fleet runs on compressed natural gas. The paint scheme is white, with "Regional Transit" in large letters in the center, on all sides. On the sides, a small "Kern Regional Transit" logo is directly in front of "Regional Transit", with the slogan "...your county connection" directly behind. Changeable signs, which list the destination city, are only on the front and left side of the bus.

Maintenance facility
The maintenance facility is located on Victor Street, just south of Olive Drive in Northwest Bakersfield. It contains parking for the entire fleet, shops, bus wash, and cleaning facilities. The facility does not contain the headquarters for the agency. That is located in the Public Services Building on "M" Street.

References

External links
 kerntransit.org

Antelope Valley
Bus transportation in California
Mojave Desert
National Express companies
Public transportation in Kern County, California
Public transportation in Los Angeles County, California
Public transportation in the San Joaquin Valley Area
Ridgecrest, California
Transportation in Bakersfield, California
Transport companies established in 1981
1981 establishments in California